Bushey Hall was a historic house built in 1428 for Thomas Montacute, 4th Earl of Salisbury. It was also the home of Sir John Marsham, 1st Baronet.

By 1883 Bushey Hall hosted a hydrotherapeutic institute in its 250 acres of parkland. The establishment boasted Turkish, Russian, Electric and pine baths while treatments included massage.

The manor house was demolished in the nineteenth century, and a nearby Bushey Hall, built on a different site, was demolished after World War II.

References

Country houses in Hertfordshire
Demolished buildings and structures in England
Buildings and structures completed in 1428